Skordalia or skordhalia or skorthalia (Greek: σκορδαλιά , also called αλιάδα, aliada/aliatha), is a thick purée in Greek cuisine made of garlic in a base of potatoes, walnuts, almonds or liquid-soaked stale bread mixed with olive oil in to make a smooth emulsion, to which some vinegar is added. It is usually made in a mortar and pestle. Skordalia is served as a sauce, side dish, or dip.

Overview

Skordalia is the modern equivalent of ancient skorothalmi. The name, on the other hand, may be a pleonastic compound of Greek σκόρδο  'garlic' and Italian agliata  'garlicky'.

Skordalia is usually served with batter-fried fish (notably salt cod, μπακαλιάρος), fried vegetables (notably eggplant and zucchini), poached fish, or boiled vegetables (notably beets).  It is sometimes used as a dip.

Variants of skordalia may include eggs as the emulsifier, omitting or reducing the bulk ingredient, which makes for a result similar to the Provençal aïoli and Catalan allioli. In the Ionian Islands, cod stock and lemon are usually added instead of vinegar, and then skordalia is eaten as a main dish.

See also

 Agliata – an Italian garlic sauce
 Aioli – a Provençal and Catalan garlic sauce
 Garlic sauce
 Tzatziki – a sauce of cucumber, garlic, and yoghurt
 List of bread dishes
 List of dips
 List of garlic dishes
 List of sauces

References

Greek appetizers
Greek cuisine
Cypriot cuisine
Garlic dishes
Bread dishes
Greek sauces
Ancient Greek cuisine